Michigan Avenue may refer to:

 Michigan Avenue (Chicago)
 Michigan Avenue (Michigan), a designation for much of both current and former U.S. Route 12 in Michigan
 Michigan Avenue (Lansing, Michigan), a street through the State Capitol area, a portion of which is M-143